The Cascade red fox (Vulpes vulpes cascadensis) is an endangered subspecies of red fox endemic to the state of Washington in the United States.

Origins
The ancestors of the Cascade red fox colonized North America after crossing the Bering landbridge during the Illinoian glaciation over 300,000 years ago. During the Wisconsin glaciation, they were pushed south to escape to ice free forests.  From that point, they adapted to the colder climate and became distinct. After the glaciation, they moved up into the mountains where conditions were similar.

Diet 
They prey on small mammals and birds living only in the mountains. Due to this, they have an ecology distinct from lowland red foxes.

Distribution and habitat
The range of the Cascade red fox is estimated to be 4500 km2, but may be as large as 40000 km2. It lives in the subalpine meadows and parklands of the Cascade Mountains, as well as the open forests on the eastern slope. It does not however inhabit the densely forested western slope. It may inhabit the very southern parts of British Columbia. Recent surveys have suggested that they are becoming rarer. This might be due to habitat loss from climate change, logging, and increased recreation in winter allowing other predators such as coyotes and lowland red foxes to enter their habitat. Some populations might have gone extinct. The current number of individual seems to be less than 5.

Conservation
The Cascade red fox is a Natural Heritage Critically Imperiled Species, as well as a Washington Endangered Species. Lack of information has made conservation efforts much harder.

See also

 Sierra Nevada red fox
 American red fox

References

Vulpes
Subspecies